Like all municipalities of Puerto Rico, Vieques is subdivided into administrative units called barrios, which are roughly comparable to minor civil divisions, (and means wards or boroughs or neighborhoods in English). The barrios and subbarrios, in turn, are further subdivided into smaller local populated place areas/units called sectores (sectors in English). The types of sectores may vary, from normally sector to urbanización to reparto to barriada to residencial, among others. Some sectors appear in two barrios.

List of sectors by barrio

Florida
Comunidad César “Coca” González
Sector Barrancón
Sector Gobeo
Sector Martineau
Sector Monte Santo
Sector Monte Santo Playa
Sector PRRA
Sector Tortuguero
Sector Villa Borinquen
Urbanización Brisas Las Marías
Urbanización Ciudad Dorada
Urbanización Estancias de Isla Nena
Urbanización Las Marías
Urbanización Lucila Franco

Isabel II barrio-pueblo

Barriada Fuerte
Calle Antonio G. Mellado
Calle Baldorioty de Castro
Calle Benítez Castaño
Calle Cañón
Calle Carlos Lebrum
Calle Muñoz Rivera
Calle Plinio Peterson
Calle Prudencio Quiñones
Calle Tomás Pérez Brignoni
Calle Víctor Duteill
Calle 65 de Infantería
Condominio Terra San Francisco
Sector Buena Vista
Sector Leguillow
Sector Pueblo Nuevo

Llave
There are no sectors in Llave barrio.

Mosquito
There are no sectors in Mosquito barrio.

Puerto Diablo

Sector Bastimento
Sector Bravos de Boston
Sector Corea
Sector Líbano
Sector Morropouse
Sector Mousco
Sector Pueblo Nuevo
Sector Santa María
Sector Villa Borinquen
Sector Villa Caobo

Puerto Ferro
Sector Caballo Pelao
Sector Destino
Sector Los Chivos
Sector Luján
Sector Monte Carmelo
Urbanización Isabel II
Urbanización Jardines de Vieques

Puerto Real
Sector Húcares
Sector Hueca
Sector La Esperanza
Sector La Llave
Sector La Mina
Sector Los Marines
Sector Pilón
Sector Pozo Prieto
Sector Puerto Real

Punta Arenas
There are no sectors in Punta Arenas barrio.

See also

 List of communities in Puerto Rico

References

Vieques
Vieques